Arthur Clarence Rennie (20 June 1906 – 10 May 1998) was an Australian rules footballer who played for the Essendon Football Club in the Victorian Football League (VFL). He was cleared to fellow VFL club, Melbourne, in 1930, but he did not play a senior game for them. Rennie later played for Victorian Football Association (VFA) team Prahran for several seasons.

Rennie's brother, Les, also played senior football for Essendon.

Notes

External links 
		

Essendon Football Club past player profile
Demonwiki profile

1906 births
1998 deaths
Australian rules footballers from Victoria (Australia)
Essendon Football Club players
Prahran Football Club players